Isanthcogna is a former  Tongva-Gabrieleño Native American settlement in Los Angeles County, California.

It was located at Mission Vieja, near Rancho San Pascual and Mission San Gabriel Arcángel, in Whittier Narrows area of the San Gabriel Valley.

See also
Category: Tongva populated places
Tongva language
California mission clash of cultures
Ranchos in California

References

Former settlements in Los Angeles County, California
Former Native American populated places in California
Former populated places in California
San Gabriel Valley
Tongva populated places